Margaret June "Peggy" Maley (June 8, 1923 – October 1, 2007) was an American actress who appeared in film and television. In 1942, aged 18 or 19, she was crowned Miss Atlantic City.

Career

Film
Maley delivered the feeder line to Marlon Brando in the film The Wild One: "Hey, Johnny, what are you rebelling against?"

Stage
Maley was in the Broadway productions of I Gotta Get Out (1947) and Joy to the World (1948).

Television
Maley had a brief seven-year acting career on television from 1953 to 1960. Her first appearance was as Diane Chandler in Ramar of the Jungle. She made three appearances in The Star and the Story, three on Dragnet, starring Jack Webb, three on Richard Diamond, Private Detective, and three on Perry Mason, starring Raymond Burr.

In 1957 she played Lola Florey in the Perry Mason episode, "The Case of the Silent Partner", and played "The Blonde Woman" in the 1958 episode of The Walter Winchell File "The Reporter". She made her final television appearance in 1960 as Verna in Lock-Up starring MacDonald Carey.

She appeared in Private Secretary January 10, 1954. She appeared in "Wanted Dead or Alive" the episode was "The Kovack Affair" with Steve McQueen (original air date March 28, 1959).

Personal life
Maley was the daughter of James and Grace (née Williams) Maley. She wed garment manufacturer Ricky Rafield in 1952, a marriage that lasted only 12 weeks before it was annulled. Her second marriage was in 1972 to policeman Donald Schonbrunn from New York; that marriage also was eventually dissolved.

Filmography

References

External links

 
 
 Glamour Girls of the Silver Screen

1923 births
2007 deaths
Actresses from Pennsylvania
American film actresses
American stage actresses
American television actresses
People from Pottsville, Pennsylvania
Female models from Pennsylvania
20th-century American actresses
21st-century American women